Liver casserole is a Finnish food that is made of rice, ground liver, butter, syrup, egg, onion, and raisin. It is traditionally served with lingonberry jam.

It is also sold ready-to-eat and eaten as an everyday food, and appears commonly in school lunches. In 2011, a Gallup poll of 299 schoolchildren found that liver casserole was the least liked dish in the school menus. Nevertheless, it remains as a popular convenience food.

Traditionally maksalaatikko was eaten at Christmas but these days it is rather seen as a year-round daily dish.

See also
 List of casserole dishes
 Porkkanalaatikko
 Lanttulaatikko
 Chopped liver

References

External links
 Liver casserole recipe in English

Casserole dishes
Finnish cuisine
Liver (food)
Christmas food
Meat dishes
Rice dishes
Egg dishes